Conaing Ua Cearbhaill was an Irish priest in the early eleventh century: the first recorded Archdeacon of Glendalough.

References

11th-century Irish priests
Archdeacons of Glendalough